are stagehands in traditional Japanese theatre, who dress all in black.

Lexical background
黒衣 primarily read kurogo, differentiating from the other readings kokui/kokue/kuroginu "black clothes", the go/gi suffix underlining the wearing intent. Another synonym for the stagehands was also 黒具 kurogo "black instrument" as they were meant to serve the performance.
Over time the non voiced mispronounciation kuroko also started being popularly used, and needed its own spelling that took the simple 子 ko character as an ateji (sound only), making the 黒子 kuroko word. Originally though 黒子 was read hokuro and meant "beauty spot". 
By contamination nowadays the two readings kuroko/kurogo are both available for the two spellings 黒衣/黒子.

Description
In kabuki, the kuroko serve many of the same purposes as running crew. They move scenery and props on stage, aiding in scene changes and costume changes. They will also often play the role of animals, will-o-the-wisps, or other roles which are played not by an actor in full costume, but by holding a prop. Kuroko wear all black, head to toe, in order to imply that they are invisible and not part of the action onstage.

Colour variation
The convention of wearing black to imply that the wearer is invisible on stage is a central element in bunraku puppet theatre as well. As this convention was extended to kabuki actors depicting stealthy ninja, historian Stephen Turnbull suggested that the stereotypical image of a ninja dressed all in black derived from kabuki. The theatrical convention of dressing ninja characters as apparent stagehands to imply stealth and to surprise audiences contributed to this popular image, in contrast to the historical reality that real ninjas usually dressed like civilians.

In Noh theatre, a kōken, wearing black but no mask, serves much the same purpose.

Examples from popular culture

 Kuroko methods were often used by the late Nagi Noda, notably in the Scissor Sisters music video for "She's My Man" and the MEG video for "Precious".
 A Kuroko character appears in some of the Samurai Shodown and Power Instinct video games as the referee, and also a secret playable character occasionally. Hr also appears in the series' crossover with Granblue Fantasy.
 Kuroko are Ryoko Mendo's personal servants in the manga series Urusei Yatsura.
 Kuroko are used extensively in two Super Sentai series, namely "Ninpuu Sentai Hurricaneger" (2002) and "Samurai Sentai Shinkenger" (2009). In the latter's case, when Kamen Rider Decade crossed over with Shinkenger, Tsukasa Kadoya a.k.a. Kamen Rider Decade appears in the Sentai's world as one of the Kuroko of the Shiba household.
 The title character of Kuroko's Basketball has the ability of misdirection, which makes him quasi-invisible. This is a reference to the invisibility of the kuroko.
 In Monster Musume, Kuroko is the first name of the government agent Ms. Smith. She wears all black and likes to manipulate the other characters and events of the series from the background.
 In the variety show Gaki no Tsukai, Hitoshi Matsumoto is assisted by the other show members -whom are all dressed as Kuroko- in order to achieve nonsensical sports challenges.
 In Tomodachi Collection and in the Japanese version of Tomodachi Life the generic non-shopkeepers heads wear a Kuroko mask. This was changed to a carved wooden head in the American version, a robot head in the European version, and a racing helmet in the Korean version.

See also
Grip (job)

References

Shōriya Aragorō (2006). www.kabuki21.com. Accessed 29 August 2006.

Kabuki
Bunraku
Stage crew
Theatrical occupations